Bario steindachneri is a species of characin from Brazil and Peru.  It is the only member of its genus. It is found in a freshwater environment within a pelagic depth range in a tropical climate.

B. steindachneri can reach the maximum recorded length of about 9 cm (3.5 in) as an unsexed male. It is found in the Amazon River basin of South America.

The fish is named in honor of Austrian ichthyologist Franz Steindachner (1834-1919), who originally described this species in 1891 but unwittingly used a name that already been used.

References

Notes
 

Characidae

Freshwater fish of South America
Fish of Brazil
Fish of Peru
Taxa named by George S. Myers
Fish described in 1893
Taxa named by Carl H. Eigenmann
Monotypic fish genera